Canadian National Railway class O-8 was a class of  steam locomotives. Forty-four tank locomotives were built by the Grand Trunk Railway (GT) in their Point St. Charles shops from 1884 through 1895. Most were built with round-topped saddle-tanks and classified as F4 by GT and later O-8-a by CN, but the eight built in 1887 had rectangular side tanks and were designated as class F3 by GT and O-8-b by CN. Thirty-nine of the class survived to receive CN numbers, but most were scrapped or sold within the first decade of CN operation. Two remained in service until 1940. CN number 7105 was sold to Consolidated Sand and Gravel Company in 1928 and served as their number 101 until repurchased in 1952 for the CN Museum Train. It was renumbered 247 and transferred to the Canada Science and Technology Museum in 1967.

References 

0-6-0T locomotives
O-08
Shunting locomotives